The 1949 Monte Carlo Rally was the 19th Rallye Automobile de Monte-Carlo, the first since the end of the Second World War. It was won by Jean Trévoux.

Entry list

Results

References

External links 

Monte Carlo Rally
Monte Carlo Rally
Monte Carlo Rally
Monte Carlo Rally